The 2005 National Camogie League is a competition in the women's team field sport of camogie was won by Galway, who defeated Cork in the final, played at Thurles.

Background
Galway were without star players Lourda Kavanagh and Áine Hilary due to injury, and their victory was more remarkable for the fact they failed to win a single league match in 2004, but under the new management team of former player Sharon Glynn, former U21 hurler Damian Coleman and former All-Ireland winner PJ Molloy.

Arrangements

The Final
Galway’s match-turning goal came two minutes into injury-time of the first half when Brenda Kerins found the waiting Veronica Curtin who scored to put Galway 1-4 to 0-3 ahead.
 Galway started nervously and had to wait 23 minutes before their opening score, a point from full-forward Veronica Curtin who was to marry to selector Damian Coleman. After Emer Dillon and Curtin exchanged points early in the second half, Cork closed the gap with two Jennifer O'Leary frees, the second which came 12 minutes into the half was Cork’s last score of the day. Galway too failed to score again until the 20th minute when Veronica Curtin sent over her fifth point.

Goalkeeper misses penalty
Galway had a chance to wrap it up with seven minutes to go when they were awarded a penalty. Goalkeeper Stephanie Gannon, the 2004 young player of the year, ran the length of the pitch to take the penalty, but it was saved on the line.

Aftermath
Galway manager Damian Coleman said:
"We came determined to compete and win. Those girls did everything that was asked of them, I am so proud of them.

Division 2
The Junior National League, known since 2006 as Division Two, was won by Cork intermediates who defeated Galway intermediates in the final.

Final stages

References

External links
 Camogie Association

National Camogie League
2005